DWYS (101.1 FM), broadcasting as 101.1 Yes The Best, is a radio station owned and operated by Manila Broadcasting Company through its licensee Pacific Broadcasting System. It serves as the flagship station of Yes The Best Network. The station's studio is located at the MBC Building, Star City, Vicente Sotto St., CCP Complex, Roxas Boulevard, Pasay, and its transmitter is located at the BSA Twin Towers, Bank Drive, Ortigas Center, Mandaluyong, sharing the same site with 90.7 Love Radio & 96.3 Easy Rock.

As of Q4 2022, 101.1 Yes The Best is the 4th most-listened to FM radio station in Metro Manila, based on a survey commissioned by Kantar Media Philippines and Kapisanan ng mga Brodkaster ng Pilipinas.

History

1968-1985: DZFX
Originally operated by Makati Broadcasting Network Corporation which was owned by businessmen Tony and Bob Garcia and Adolfo Duarte, it began broadcasting on May 31, 1968, as DZFX 101.1 and was the country's first stereo-multiplex radio station on the FM band. It played classical music and elevator music (at that time, they competed against non-commercial 98.7 DZFE) until October 11, 1985, and a few minutes before 12 noon, it played its last song, a Mozart piece, just before the top of the hour. A five-second silence ensued, and the production launch presentation was played saying goodbye to DZFX and saying hello to Kiss FM.

1985-1989: Kiss FM
Shortly after DZFX 101.1's sign off on October 11, 1985, it was rebranded as Kiss FM 101.1 (call letters DWKS) with studios located at 14th floor, Insular Life Building, Ayala Ave. cor. Paseo de Roxas, Makati Central Business District, with "Dancing in the Streets" by Mick Jagger and David Bowie, as its first song played on the station. It introduced innovations like having the frequency number on its telephone number, programs like Top 20 at 12 and the launch date as 10–11, standing as the frequency. From 1985, it had the Contemporary Hit Radio format, competing directly with 99.5 RT (now 99.5 Play FM) and 97.1 WLS-FM (now Barangay LS 97.1). Singer Martin Nievera also worked with the station under the name "Mad Man", and had his program every Saturday afternoons.

1989-1995: Kiss Jazz
It changed its name to Kiss Jazz 101.1 and transformed into a smooth jazz format from June 1989 to December 1995 competing directly with Citylite 88.3 (now Jam 88.3) before it quietly went off the air.

1995-1998: Showbiz Tsismis
On December 18, 1995, Manila Broadcasting Company acquired the station from Makati Broadcasting Network and launched the first show business gossip and music-format FM station in the country, 101.1 Showbiz Tsismis. Under the call sign DWST, which stood for "Showbiz Tsismis" (Showbiz Gossip), the station's studio moved to new facilities at the FJE Building, Makati, integrated with the wider DZRH studios.

101.1 Showbiz Tsismis had a mix of show business news and the latest music hits, and even employed reporters with a reporting style similar to that of local AM stations. It is also simulcast thru provincial via-satellite FM stations in the country, a first then in Philippine radio history.

1998-present: Yes FM/Yes the Best
On December 6, 1998, 101.1 was re-launched as Yes FM 101.1 under the call letters DWYS and switched to a mass-based format, similar to its sister station 90.7 Love Radio and became the undisputed number 1 FM station from 1999 to 2002.

In July 2002, all MBC stations from FJE Building in Makati were relocated and transferred to Star City Complex in Pasay, Philippines.

In 2008, Yes FM 101.1 was again repackaged and adopted the slogan "Automatic 'Yan!" (That's Automatic!). The playlists used were almost the same as 90.7 Love Radio but the programming was different.

In 2012, as part of "Radyo? Dalawa Lang Yan!" (Radio? There's Only Two!) campaign (which was launched by Yes FM and Love Radio in the first quarter of 2011), some DJs from 90.7 Love Radio such as Rica Herra, Missy Hista, Rico Pañero and Lala Banderas were moved to Yes FM 101.1 in exchange for Diego Bandido, Emma Harot, Kristine Dera and Robin Sienna, as well as the new branding as the "Hayahay" station, which later became also the slogan on other Yes FM and several Hot FM and Love Radio stations.

In 2014, Yes FM was awarded the Gawad Tanglaw Hall of Fame award, having been awarded as the Best FM Station for five consecutive years.

Since 2015, Yes FM banters have been based on 1 peso Hayahay quotes (e.g. "Kung Piso lang sana ang hot meals sa Cebu Pacific... Ay! Hayahay ang Buhay!").

On July 18, 2016, at exactly 6:00am, the station was rebranded as 101.1 Yes The Best, with their new slogan, "The Millennials' Choice". It removed its Sunday playlist. Its DJs began talking in a mix of English and Tagalog, unlike its sister station.

On May 1, 2017, 101.1 Yes The Best launched Yes The Best App, a mobile application that is also the first social TV experience for FM Radio in the Philippines. Also, all Yes FM provincial stations were rebranded as Yes The Best.

On August 10, 2018, their YouTube channel Yes The Best Manila received a Silver Play Button from YouTube for reaching 100,000 subscribers. As of the present, Yes The Best Manila has more than 600,000 subscribers and still counting. Their channel produces blogs, dance challenges, radio show segments, and more.

On October 1, 2018, the station introduced another new DJ, Mega Wanda. Then, on October 26, 2018, Ganda Wanda left the station due to resignation. Mega Wanda went solo and she changed her on-air name to Ganda Wanda.

On December 8, 2018, the station celebrated its 20th anniversary. Their YouTube channel uploaded a thanksgiving video for the 20 years of airing on the radio.

On October 2, 2019, the main studios of 101.1 Yes The Best at the MBC Building, CCP Complex in Pasay, along with its sister MBC Manila radio stations, were affected by a major fire that originated in the nearby Star City theme park. In interim, Yes The Best currently broadcasts from its backup studio in BSA Twin Towers, where its transmitter is located.

On November 15, 2021, after a 2-year hiatus, Yes! The Best Manila studios along with sister stations Love Radio Manila and Easy Rock Manila, returned to the newly renovated MBC Building inside the Star City complex (which is still under rehabilitation and reconstruction). at the same day, MBC relaunched its new corporate slogan, Sama-Sama Tayo, Pilipino! (lit. We are all Filipinos!) along with the new logos of all MBC radio stations. However, MBC's flagship AM station DZRH retained its interim studios at the Design Center of the Philippines which is near the MBC Building, they will soon follow suit with the return of the MBC Building (however it was officially moved on December 17, 2021).

References

External links
 
  Archive of Old DWYS Logos (c. 1997)

OPM formatted radio stations in the Philippines
Pacific Broadcasting Systems stations
101.1 Yes The Best
Radio stations established in 1980